Alissa Nutting (born 1980 or 1981) is an American author and creative writing professor. Her writing has appeared in Tin House, Fence, BOMB and the fairy tale anthology My Mother She Killed Me, My Father He Ate Me. She is an associate professor at Grinnell College.

Early career
Nutting attended Bloomingdale High School in Valrico, Florida. She received a bachelor's degree from the University of Florida and a Master of Fine Arts from the University of Alabama. At the University of Alabama, she served as editor of the Black Warrior Review. Nutting has taught creative writing at John Carroll University and the University of Nevada, Las Vegas. She currently teaches at Grinnell College.

Writing
Nutting is author of the short story collection Unclean Jobs for Women and Girls. The book was selected by judge Ben Marcus as winner of the 6th Starcherone Prize for Innovative Fiction. The book, published by now-defunct Starcherone Books, was a 2010 ForeWord Book of the Year finalist, as well as an Eric Hoffer Montaigne Medal finalist for thought-provoking texts.

Tampa is a novel that combines erotica, satire and social criticism. It claims to address double standards like gender-based expectations of women, regarding beauty and the great extent of mischief that women may be forgiven provided they are young and beauteous. The novel centres on a middle-school teacher who has sexual relations with her students. Nutting was inspired by Debra Lafave, a teacher charged with having sex with her under-age students in 2005. Nutting went to high school with Lafave; seeing someone she knew on the news raised her awareness of the issue of female predators. The book was banned in many bookstores for being too explicit.

When asked if it was difficult to come in and out of perspective with a deranged character Nutting replied: "It was like going under anesthesia—once I was inside it, I felt like I had to make the most of it because it was so difficult to go in and out. I ended up writing in really marathon sessions, 7-8 hours at a time. After I was done each day I had this hangover feeling— my body felt a grand fatigue even though I’d been seated the whole time. It took me a while to become verbal again after writing." (Inside Edition). She also explains how her publisher and editors understood that the content needed to be explicit and they didn’t ask her to tone it down.

She contributed to The &NOW Awards 2: The Best Innovative Writing, &NOW Books, May 2013.

Her writing has appeared in The Norton Introduction to Literature, Fence, Tin House, The New York Times, Bomb, Conduit, and O: The Oprah Magazine. In April 2021, the television series adaptation of her book Made for Love premiered on HBO Max.

Personal life
Nutting's first husband was Shawn Nutting, a tattoo artist. In 2013 Nutting gave birth to their daughter Sparrow Jane before the couple split up. Nutting lives in Iowa and is now married to writer and fellow Grinnell professor Dean Bakopoulos.

Bibliography
 Unclean Jobs for Women and Girls, Starcherone Books, Buffalo, New York 2010, 
 Tampa, Ecco, 2013, 
 Made for Love, Ecco, 2017,

References

External links

Living people
American women short story writers
University of Florida alumni
Year of birth missing (living people)
American women novelists
American women editors
American editors
John Carroll University faculty
University of Alabama alumni
University of Nevada, Las Vegas faculty
21st-century American novelists
21st-century American women writers
21st-century American short story writers
Novelists from Iowa
Grinnell College faculty
Novelists from Michigan
People from Valrico, Florida
American women academics
Writers from Tampa, Florida